Midford railway station was a single-platform station on the Bath extension of the Somerset and Dorset Railway, just to the north of the point where the double-track became a single track. It served the village of Midford.  The station was closed with the rest of the line in March 1966 under the Beeching axe, though it had been unstaffed for some years before that.

There was a small goods yard to the north of the station, towards the entrance to the Combe Down Tunnel, which loaded Fuller's earth from Tucking Mill.  South of the station, a signal box presided over the double track junction: the railway then ran across the Midford valley on a high viaduct that still exists.

For about four years from 1911 to 1915, Midford had a second railway station, Midford Halt located on the GWR Camerton Branch, which passed under the S&DJR viaduct.

Services

The site today

After a long period in private hands the site is now part of a surfaced cycleway and footpath — the Two Tunnels Greenway. The platform and remains of the goods shed survive.

The station is now owned by the New Somerset and Dorset Railway who have plans to rebuild the station building and relay the track, when the cycleway will be diverted or accommodated. The site has been cleared to uncover the remains of the old station.

The New Somerset and Dorset Railway
The New Somerset and Dorset Railway formed in early 2009 aims to restore the complete line to mainline operations, so it is possible that Midford will one day see passengers again.

As the initial objectives of the New S&D are focused on the southern end of the line (notably Blandford-Bournemouth), in the short term Midford will be restored as a cafe and information centre, along much the same lines as the existing Shillingstone Station Project.

References

 Somerset Railway Stations by Mike Oakley, Dovecote Press, 2002

External links
 Station on navigable O.S. map
 Midford Station page on the New Somerset & Dorset Railway website

Disused railway stations in Somerset
Former Somerset and Dorset Joint Railway stations
Railway stations in Great Britain opened in 1874
Railway stations in Great Britain closed in 1966
Beeching closures in England
Combe Down